Cashrewards is an Australian cashback reward program, founded in 2014. It enables users to get a portion of their cash back when making a purchase online or in-store at over 1,700 retailers.

Cashrewards is partnered with over 1,700 brands, including Amazon, Myer, David Jones, Groupon, Coles, Agoda, Lenovo, Apple, Net-A-Porter, Dan Murphy's, Alibaba, Microsoft and Booking.com. Each participating partner pays a commission to Cashrewards, which is then shared with its members as a cashback offer. In the first five years the company has been operating, Cashrewards has generated A$2 billion in revenue for its partners, and A$100 million as cashback to its members.

In addition to offering cashback, Cashrewards also features a selection of exclusive offers and promotions from its retail partners.

History 
Cashrewards was founded in 2014 by Andrew and Lorica Clarke after their child developed and survived a serious illness. Seeking a way to give back to those who supported them during this time, they set up Cashrewards to help Australians save on their shopping while also contributing to charitable organisations.

In 2017, Cashrewards joined the Salesforce charity initiative Pledge 1%. Founders Andrew & Lorica chose the Starlight Children’s Foundation due to the support the organisation provided to their child while battling illness.

In 2018, Cashrewards launched its In-Store Offers platform. Partnering with Visa, the platform allows members with a Visa credit card or debit card to earn cashback at hundreds of stores throughout Australia.

In 2019, Cashrewards founder Andrew Clarke stated that the company seeks to achieve an initial public offering (IPO) by 2020. October 2019 also saw Cashrewards expand its In-Store Offers platform by partnering with Mastercard, allowing members using this payment card provider to access cashback benefits from participating retailers.

In July 2021, Cashrewards partnered with ANZ to launch Cashrewards Max. Exclusive to ANZ credit and debit card users, CashbackMax members can receive more cashback offers through participating retailers.

Funding 
In 2018, Cashrewards secured A$3 million in capital from Silicon Valley-based Partners for Growth (PFG) through a tailored debt funding facility.

In 2019, it acquired an additional A$5.25 million external equity funding round from Sydney-based Alium Capital.

Philanthropy 
The Cashrewards IPO was used to generate awareness for the Starlight Children’s Foundation in 2020 during the COVID-19 crisis. Cashrewards became the first ASX-listed company to pledge one per cent of its equity to charity. Alongside companies such as Atlassian, Cashrewards is part of the Pledge 1% initiative. They have pledged to donate one percent of business equity and one percent of every cashback reward redeemed to the Starlight Children's Foundation.

Awards and accolades 

|-
| 2016
| Finalist: Best Fintech Startup
| StartCon
| 
| Australasian Startup Awards 2016
| 
|-
| 2016
| Deloitte Tech Fast 50 Awards Australia
| Deloitte
| 
| Deloitte Technology Fast 500 2016
| 
|-
| 2017
| Finalist: E-commerce Company of the Year
| StartCon
| 
| Australasian Startup Awards 2017
| 
|-
| 2017
| Finalist: NSW Region
| Telstra
| 
| Telstra Business Awards 2017
| 
|-
| 2017
| Finalist: Eastern Region
| Ernst & Young (EY)
| 
| Ernst & Young Entrepreneur Of The Year Award 2017
| 
|-
| 2017
| Smart50 List (4th Place)
| SmartCompany
| 
| Smart50 Awards 2017
| 
|-
| 2017
| Finalist: Corporate Social Responsibility Program of the Year
| Optus & MyBusiness
| 
| Optus My Business Awards 2017
| 
|-
| 2017
| Media, Marketing and Advertising Business of the Year
| Optus & MyBusiness
| 
| Optus My Business Awards 2017
| 
|-
| 2017
| Finalist: Deloitte Tech Fast 50 Awards Australia
| Deloitte
| 
| Deloitte Technology Fast 500 2017
| 
|-
| 2017
| Businesses of Tomorrow Award
| Westpac
| 
| Westpac Businesses of Tomorrow 2017
| 
|-
| 2018
| Fast 100 List (6th Place)
| The Australian Financial Review
| 
| Financial Review Fast 100 2018
| 
|-
| 2018
| Nora Best Loyalty Marketing
| Nora
| 
| Nora Solution Partner Awards
|

References

External links 
 

Cashback and rebate
Online grocers
Online retailers of Australia